The Church of Saints Cyril and Methodius is a Roman Catholic church in Vinkovci, Croatia.

History 

The church was built in 1984.

It was damaged during the Croatian War of Independence, but renovated in 1997.

References 

Churches in Croatia
Vinkovci
Roman Catholic churches in Vukovar-Syrmia County